Maxwell Holmes Bushby  (19 July 1927 – 21 August 1994) was an Australian politician. He was elected to the Tasmanian House of Assembly in 1961 as a Liberal member for Bass. He was Chair of Committees from 1966 to 1972 and Speaker from 1982 to 1986. He was defeated at the 1986 election.

His son, David Bushby, was also a politician, serving as a Senator for Tasmania from 2007 to January 2019, before he was appointed as Australia's consul-general in Chicago. Maxwell's daughter, Wendy Askew, was appointed as her brother's replacement, serving as a Senator for Tasmania since 6 March 2019.

References

1927 births
1994 deaths
Liberal Party of Australia members of the Parliament of Tasmania
Members of the Tasmanian House of Assembly
Speakers of the Tasmanian House of Assembly
Australian Officers of the Order of the British Empire
20th-century Australian politicians
Politicians from Launceston, Tasmania